Morteza Sarmadi is an Iranian diplomat and former Vice Minister of Foreign Affairs in Iran's Ministry of Foreign Affairs, until his retirement. He also served as an Iranian Ambassador to the UK from 2000 to 2004 and State Department spokesman from 1981 to 1991.

References

Ambassadors of Iran to the United Kingdom
Living people
Year of birth missing (living people)
Spokespersons for the Ministry of Foreign Affairs of Iran